Spencer Township, Indiana may refer to one of the following places:

 Spencer Township, DeKalb County, Indiana
 Spencer Township, Harrison County, Indiana
 Spencer Township, Jennings County, Indiana

See also

Spencer Township (disambiguation)

Indiana township disambiguation pages